The AICTA LMD 416-00R is a Czech aircraft engine, that was designed and produced by AICTA Design Work of Prague for use in light aircraft.

The company seems to have been founded about 2012 and gone out of business in 2016.

Design and development
The engine is a four-cylinder horizontally-opposed,  displacement, air and liquid-cooled, diesel engine design, with a helical gear mechanical gearbox-style of reduction drive with reduction ratio of 1.6:1. It produces  at 3950 rpm, with a compression ratio of 18:1.

The engine can run on diesel fuel or Jet A-1.

Specifications (LMD 416-00R)

See also

References

External links
Official website archives on Archive.org

AICTA aircraft engines
Aircraft diesel engines